Yasushi Adachi (14 October 1965, Osaka - ) is a Japanese Politician of Nippon Ishin no Kai (Japan Innovation Party) serving as a member of the House of Representatives, a position that he has been elected to three times, once in 2012, 2014, and 2021. After the 2021 House of Representatives election, Adachi was appointed by co-party leader Baba Nobuyuki to the position of the Chairperson of Diet Caucus Policy Affairs Research Council, the de facto leader of all policy affairs within the party.  Adachi supports the making free education a constitutional right, saying that it would help slow the decline in birthrate.

Early life 
Yasushi Adachi was born in Izumiotsu, Osaka Prefecture and grew up in Ibaraki, Osaka Prefecture. After graduating from Osaka Ibaraki High School, he went on to Kyoto University, where he received his Bachelor's and Master's degrees in Civil Engineering. In 1990, he joined the Ministry of International Trade and Industry (MITI). In 1998, he received his Master's degree in Public Administration from Columbia University. In 2013, he retired from the Ministry after the Great East Japan Earthquake.

Political career 
Adachi was first elected to the House of Representatives in the 46th general election, running for the Japan Restoration Party from Osaka 9th district (Japanese: 大阪府第9区).

Upon the split within the JRP, caused by policy differences between the right-winged faction led by former Tokyo Governor Shintaro Ishihara and the moderate Osaka Governor Toru Hashimoto, Adachi joined the Hashimoto-led Japan Innovation Party ( a merger with the centre-left Unity Party /Yui-no-To, led by Kenji Eda), alongside most of his peers in Osaka.

In the 47th general election for the House of Representatives, Adachi was defeated by Kenji Harada (Japanese: 原田憲治) of the Liberal Democratic Party, and was resurrected and elected from Kinki Propositional representation Block (Japanese: 比例近畿ブロック).

Upon the split within the JIP, caused by differences over electoral pact negotiation with the centre-left Democratic Party of Japan, Adachi once again joined the anti-coalition party, Initiatives from Osaka （おおさか維新の会/ Osaka Ishin-No-Kai）, led by Toru Hashimoto. Initiatives from Osaka is renamed Nippon Ishin-No-Kai (日本維新の会）while the pro-coalition faction led by Kenji Eda merged with the Democratic Party of Japan, the predecessor to the Constitutional Democratic Party.

In the 48th general election for the House of Representatives in 2017, he was again narrowly defeated by Harada, this time by about 2,000 votes, and was resurrected and re-elected from the Kinki Propositional representation Block.

In the 49th general election for the House of Representatives in 2021, he defeated his rival Harada,  by about 50,000 votes, in a 19.6 point swing a margin large enough to ensure Harada was not resurrected and re-elected on Proportional Votes.

References

Living people
Nippon Ishin no Kai politicians
Members of the House of Representatives from Osaka Prefecture
School of International and Public Affairs, Columbia University alumni
1965 births